Muchachas que estudian is a 1939  Argentine comedy film directed and written by Manuel Romero. The film premiered on September 6, 1939 in Buenos Aires and starred Sofía Bozán, Enrique Serrano and Delia Garcés.

Cast
Sofía Bozán ...  Luisa
Enrique Serrano ...  Professor Castro
Alicia Vignoli ...  Mercedes
Delia Garcés ...  Alcira
Pepita Serrador ...  Ana Del Valle
Alicia Barrié ...  Isabel
Ernesto Raquén ...  Ricardo López
Enrique Roldán ...  Emilio
Ana May ...  Dolores
Perla Mux ...  Lucy
Carmen del Moral ...  Magda
Carlos Tajes ...  Pedro
Roberto Blanco ...  Tolo
Armando Durán ...  Carlos
Mary Dormal ...  Isabel's Mother
Alberto Terrones ...  Isabel's Father

External links
 

1939 films
1930s Spanish-language films
Argentine black-and-white films
1939 comedy films
Films directed by Manuel Romero
Argentine comedy films
1930s Argentine films